In the Hands of Love (released in the US under the title Vittorio) is the debut studio album by Italian operatic tenor Vittorio Grigolo, released in 2006 by Polydor Records.

Background
The first single from the album, "You Are My Miracle" featuring Nicole Scherzinger, was released in 2006 as a debut single to American audiences, while another version of the song features singer Katherine Jenkins.

Track listing

Charts

Weekly charts

Year-end charts

Certifications

References

2006 debut albums
Polydor Records albums
European Border Breakers Award-winning albums